The Confederação Brasileira de Trabalhadores Cristâos (CBTC) is a trade union centre in Brazil. It is affiliated with the International Trade Union Confederation.

References

Trade unions in Brazil
International Trade Union Confederation
Brazil